An election for Redbridge London Borough Council took place on 3 May 2018, the same day as for other London Boroughs. All 63 seats were up for election, with new ward boundaries in place. The Labour Party retained control of the council with an increased majority, taking 81% of the seats.

Results

|}

†Notional changes calculated by the BBC.

The election was fought on new ward boundaries.  The Labour Party won 51 seats (up 16 from 2014), the Conservatives won 12 (down 13 from 2014). Three LibDem councillors were elected in 2014, but none in 2018. Due to the boundary changes, the BBC calculated 'notional' seat changes of +13 for Labour and -13 for the Conservatives.

Ward Results

Aldborough

Barkingside

Bridge

Note: Turbefield subsequently defected to Reform UK.

Chadwell

Churchfields

Clayhall

Clementswood

Cranbrook

Fairlop

Fulwell

Goodmayes

Hainault

Ilford Town

Loxford

Mayfield

Monkhams

Newbury

Seven Kings

South Woodford

Valentines

Wanstead Park

Wanstead Village

References

2018 London Borough council elections
2018